USS Timbalier (AVP-54) was a  of the United States Navy. She was commissioned shortly after the end of World War II, and served between 1946 and her decommissioning in 1954. She later saw commercial service as the Greek cruise ship MV Rodos.

Construction and commissioning 

Timbalier was built at the Lake Washington Shipyard, at Houghton, Washington, with her keel laid down on 9 November 1942. She was launched on 18 April 1943, sponsored by Mrs. S. B. Dunlap. Timbalier, and her sister , were initially ordered in February 1944 to be completed at the Puget Sound Navy Yard, but were transferred back to the Lake Washington Shipyard in June 1945. The resulting delay meant that she was not commissioned until 24 May 1946.

US Navy career

Timbalier departed from Seattle, Washington on 20 June 1946, arriving at San Francisco, California, two days later on 22 June 1946. She transferred to Alameda, California, where she loaded stores and airplane spare parts before sailing for San Diego, California, on 26 June 1946. She underwent a period of sea trials off the United States West Coast, completing them on 27 July 1946. She then departed bound for Panama, transiting the Panama Canal on 3 August 1946. Timbalier then proceeded to the shipyards at New York City.

Timbalier was at the New York Naval Shipyard at Brooklyn, New York, until 8 November 1946, when she departed for Norfolk, Virginia, which she reached on 9 November 1946. She spent the rest of November 1946 in the vicinity of Hampton Roads, Virginia.

Timbalier departed Hampton Roads on 3 December 1946, bound for San Juan, Puerto Rico. She arrived there on 7 December 1946, beginning service with Fleet Air Wing 11 (FAW-11). She was based at Trinidad, and carried out operations in the Caribbean and off the United States East Coast. She served with FAW-11 as a tender for their Martin PBM Mariner flying boats for the rest of her naval career. With the increase in the Soviet submarine threat by 1951, the PBM Mariner squadrons deployed to carry out reconnaissance off the U.S. East Coast, and plansd called for them to concentrate on convoy defense and antisubmarine warfare in the event of conflict with the Soviet Union, supported by Timbalier, her sister ship , and the seaplane tender .

In 1952 Timbalier supported flying boat operations during Operation Mainbrace, a large-scale exercise of the North Atlantic Treaty Organization's navies, off the Scandinavian and Icelandic coasts. During Mainbrace, Timbalier tended flying boats operating from Lerwick in the Shetland Islands.

Decommissioning, reserve, and disposal

Timbalier was decommissioned on 15 November 1954 and placed in the Atlantic Reserve Fleet. She was struck from the Navy List on 1 May 1960, and was sold on 20 December 1960 to Panagiotis Kokkinos, of Piraeus, Greece.

Commercial service

After her sale, Timbalier became the Greek cruise ship . She was scrapped at Eleusis, Greece, in 1989.

References 

 

 

Barnegat-class seaplane tenders
Cold War auxiliary ships of the United States
1943 ships
Ships built at Lake Washington Shipyard